Nahořany is a municipality and village in Náchod District in the Hradec Králové Region of the Czech Republic. It has about 600 inhabitants.

Administrative parts
Villages of Dolsko, Doubravice, Lhota and Městec are administrative parts of Nahořany.

References

Villages in Náchod District